The Snillfjorden is a fjord that branches off the main Hemnfjorden in the municipalities of Heim and Orkland in Trøndelag county, Norway. The mouth of the Snillfjorden is at the village of Ytre Snillfjord where it joins the larger Hemnfjorden. There are small settlements along the north and south shores of the fjord, but they do not all have road connections. There is a road that follows the southern coastline for about half of the fjord, but the rest of the coastline is without roads.

See also
 List of Norwegian fjords

References

Fjords of Trøndelag
Orkland
Heim, Norway